The Niagara Purple Eagles baseball team is a varsity intercollegiate athletic team of Niagara University in Lewiston, New York, United States. The team is a member of the Metro Atlantic Athletic Conference, which is part of the National Collegiate Athletic Association's Division I. The team plays its home games at John P. Bobo Field in Lewiston, New York. The Purple Eagles are coached by Rob McCoy.

Year-by-year results
Below is a table of the program's year-by-year results.

Major League Baseball
, at least 19 former Niagara players have reached Major League Baseball, including Sal Maglie. Niagara has had 18 Major League Baseball Draft selections since the draft began in 1965.

See also
List of NCAA Division I baseball programs

References

External links